The Girango people (also known as JoSuba or Joka-Kombe) is a group of Luo people who fall in the group known as Joka Jok. They include the Suna/Suba, Wategi/Kamagambo-Kanying'ombe, Wagire, JoKasgunga, JoSidho, JoKabar, JoMur, JoKiseru etc. They migrated to Kenya from northern Uganda, and are believed to be the brothers of the Simbiti. However, the Simbiti were absorbed into Kuria community, and that is why the people of Kuria have diverse origins. Some historians tend to use the Bunchari dialect of the Kuria spoken by the Simbiti, as well as the Kuria culture followed by the Simbiti to discuss the Girango people.

References

Luo people
Ethnic groups in Kenya
Ethnic groups in Tanzania